Brighton Rock is a 2010 British crime film written and directed by Rowan Joffé and loosely based on Graham Greene's 1938 novel of the same name. The film stars Sam Riley, Andrea Riseborough, Andy Serkis, John Hurt, Sean Harris and Helen Mirren.

The novel had previously been made into a film under the same title by the Boulting brothers that premiered in 1948.  Although the novel and original film are both set in the 1930s, the 21st century adaptation is set during the Mods and Rockers era of the 1960s.

Sam Riley plays "Pinkie", the role originally played by Richard Attenborough. Filming began in October 2009. It was largely filmed in the nearby town of Eastbourne, with Eastbourne Pier standing in for Brighton Pier, and at Beachy Head. Some scenes were shot at Hedsor House in Buckinghamshire and in Brighton itself.

Plot
In 1964, Pinkie Brown, the sociopathic enforcer of a Brighton gang, murders Fred Hale, who had killed the gang leader Kite. Brown befriends Rose, a young waitress who witnessed the gang's activity, to keep an eye on her. She falls in love with him. To prevent her from being compelled to give evidence against him, he marries her. Ida, Rose's employer and a friend of Hale's, takes it upon herself to save the girl from the monster she has married.

Cast
 Sam Riley as Pinkie Brown
 Andrea Riseborough as Rose
 Andy Serkis as Mr Colleoni
 John Hurt as Phil Corkery
 Helen Mirren as Ida
 Sean Harris as Hale
 Phil Davis as Spicer
 Nonso Anozie as Dallow
 Craig Parkinson as Cubitt
 Steve Evets as Mr Wilson
 Maurice Roëves as Chief Inspector

Production
Rowan Joffé was originally uninterested in the project, which as first proposed was to be a remake of the film. After re-reading the novel, however, Joffé "fell absolutely in love with the character of Rose" and convinced the studio to let him adapt the novel directly. Joffe later explained why he did his own adaptation of the novel:

Apropos to the location, Pinkie kills Spicer by shoving a stick of Brighton rock candy down his throat.

Release
Brighton Rock premiered at the Toronto International Film Festival in September 2010 and the BFI London Film Festival in October 2010.

The film was released theatrically in the United Kingdom on 4 February 2011, and in Australia on 14 April 2011. In the United States, IFC Films released the film in August 2011, theatrically in New York City and Los Angeles, and elsewhere via video-on-demand.

Reception

Brighton Rock received mixed reviews from critics. The site's critics consensus reads: "Brighton Rock is a lean noir boasting an appealing trio of stars, but its old-fashioned presentation only reinforces how little it distinguishes itself from the superior original." Metacritic, which assigns a weighted average score from 1 to 100 to reviews from mainstream critics, gave the film a 57 based on 24 reviews indicating "mixed or average reviews". According to Stephen Holden, "Mr. Joffé has turned Brighton Rock into a full-scale film noir with the stylistic undertow of a more modern British gangster movie. As potentially lethal as the thugs may be, they are also slightly over-the-hill small-time bookies who seem anything but invincible, and the movie gives each a complicated personality. Andy Serkis is outstanding as the oily Colleoni, a smirking sybarite and crime lord with playboy airs." Holden notes "Mr. Riley, now 31, is a little too old to play a teenage gangster, and it throws the movie off somewhat. If Pinkie's recklessly impulsive behavior is that of a frightened teenager, Mr. Riley's slick hair, facial scar and cold, wide-eyed stare suggest a seasoned smoothie who has watched a lot more dirty water slosh under the bridge than any teenager could have witnessed." Nevertheless, Holden concludes "By discarding most of the theological debate [found in the book], the movie is no longer a passion play but a gritty and despairing noir. That’s good enough for me."

References

External links
 
 
 
 
 
 Brighton Rock: Rowan Joffe interview  from BBC Films

2010 films
2010 crime drama films
2010 crime thriller films
2010 thriller drama films
British gangster films
British crime drama films
British thriller drama films
British neo-noir films
Films based on British novels
Films based on works by Graham Greene
Films set in 1964
Films set in Brighton and Hove
Films set in the 1960s
Films shot in England
Films shot in London
Youth culture in the United Kingdom
Films directed by Rowan Joffé
BBC Film films
StudioCanal films
2010 directorial debut films
2010s English-language films
2010s British films